Dennis L. Jones is a Republican former member of the Florida Senate, representing the 13th District from 2002 to 2012. Previously he was a member of the Florida House of Representatives representing the 57th district from 1978 to 1982, the 53rd district from 1982 to 1992, and the 54th district from 1992 to 2000. He served as Speaker pro tempore from 1998 to 2000.

References

External links
Our Campaigns – Dennis L. Jones (FL) profile
Dennis L. Jones at Ballotpedia
Florida House of Representatives - Dennis L. Jones
Florida State Legislature – Senator Dennis L. Jones official government website
Project Vote Smart – Senator Dennis L. Jones (FL) profile
Follow the Money – Dennis L. Jones
2006 2004 2002 1998 campaign contributions

Republican Party Florida state senators
Republican Party members of the Florida House of Representatives
1941 births
Living people